The Gautam Buddha Nagar Police Commissionerate (GBNPC) (Hindi: गौतम बुद्ध नगर पुलिस आयुक्तालय) is the police department of the Gautam Buddha Nagar District, Uttar Pradesh. It is a part of Uttar Pradesh Police and has the primary responsibilities of law enforcement and investigation in Gautam Buddha Nagar.

Gautam Buddha Nagar Police Commissionerate is also known as Noida Police Commissionerate or (Noida Police).

It is headed by an IPS officer of the rank of Additional Director General of Police (ADGP) as its Commissioner of Police, who is appointed by the Home Minister of Uttar Pradesh.

The current police commissioner of Noida is 2000 batch IPS officer Laxmi Singh who is of IG rank and serving since 29 November 2022. She is the first female police commissioner in the state since the start of Commissionerate system.

History 
On 13 January 2020, Chief Minister Yogi Adityanath's Cabinet passed the decision of making 2 police Commissionerate in the state.
 First being in the Lucknow, the capital and the largest city of Uttar Pradesh
 Second one in Gautam Buddha Nagar District or Noida.

IPS Alok Singh was appointed as the first police commissioner of Gautam Buddha Nagar by the Home Department of Uttar Pradesh.

Before 2020, the police department in the district was headed by the Senior Superintendent of Police (SSP).

Headquarters 
Office of CP at Traffic Police Park in Noida serves as the headquarters of Noida Police.

On 19 January 2020, Chief Minister Yogi Adityanath inaugurated the new Commissionerate office at City's Traffic Park, Sector-108, Noida.

See also 
 Noida
 Gautam Buddha Nagar District
 Uttar Pradesh Police
 Lucknow City Police

References 

Uttar Pradesh Police
Metropolitan law enforcement agencies of India
Government agencies established in 2020
Law enforcement agencies of India
2020 establishments in Uttar Pradesh